Cornifrons ulceratalis is a species of moth in the family Crambidae. It is found in Portugal, Spain, Italy, Croatia, Bosnia and Herzegovina, Albania, Greece, Morocco, Algeria and the Canary Islands.

The wingspan is about 22 mm.

The larvae feed on Henophyton deserti and Sesamum indicum.

References

Moths described in 1870
Evergestinae
Moths of Europe